A39 or A-39  may refer to:
 Tortoise heavy assault tank, a British experimental tank in World War 2
 The FAA identifier for Ak-Chin Regional Airport

Roads
 A39 highway (Australia), a road in Victoria designated A39/B340
 A39 motorway (France), a road connecting Dijon with Dole and Bourg en Bresse
 A 39 motorway (Germany), a road connecting Salzgitter, Wolfsburg and Braunschweig
 A39 road (England)

and also:
 English Opening, Encyclopaedia of Chess Openings code